Vincent Sheehan or Vince Sheehan may refer to:

Vince Sheehan (rugby league, South Sydney) (died 1926), an Australian rugby league footballer
Vince Sheehan (born 1916) (1916–1973), an Australian rugby league footballer
Vincent Sheehan (filmmaker), an Australian filmmaker, producer and co-creator of 2016 TV series The Kettering Incident

See also
Vincent Sheean (1899–1975), American journalist and novelist